Hypodoxa ruptilinea is a moth of the family Geometridae first described by Louis Beethoven Prout in 1913. It is found on New Guinea.

References

Pseudoterpnini
Moths of New Guinea
Taxa named by Louis Beethoven Prout
Moths described in 1913